Howard James Thelin (February 7, 1921 – March 25, 2011) served in the California State Assembly for the 43rd district from 1957 to 1966 and as a Superior Court Justice. During World War II he served in the United States Army.

References

United States Army personnel of World War II
1921 births
2011 deaths
Republican Party members of the California State Assembly